Hosanna is a liturgical word in Judaism and Christianity. In Judaism it refers to a cry expressing an appeal for divine help.  In Christianity it is used as a cry of praise.

Etymology 
 
In the Hebrew Bible it is used only in verses such as "help" or "save, I pray". In the Gospels it is used as a shout of jubilation, and this has given rise to complex discussions.
In that context, the word Hosanna seems to be a "special kind of respect" given to the one who saves, saved, will save, or is saving now.  If so Hosanna means 'a special honor to the one who saves'.  The literal interpretation "Save, now!", based on Psalm 118:25, does not fully explain the occurrence of the word.

Liturgical use in different traditions

Judaism 

In Jewish liturgy, the word is applied specifically to the Hoshana Service, a cycle of prayers from which a selection is sung each morning during Sukkot, the Feast of Booths or Tabernacles. The complete cycle is sung on the seventh day of the festival, which is called Hoshana Rabbah (הושענא רבא, "Great Hoshana"). In Judaism it is always used in its original Hebrew form, הושע נא Hosha na or הושענא Hoshana.

 Christianity 

"Hosanna" many interpret as a shout of praise or adoration made in recognition of the messiahship of Jesus  on his entry into Jerusalem, "Hosanna! Blessed is the one who comes in the name of the Lᴏʀᴅ!" which forms part of the Sanctus prayer. Since those welcoming Jesus were Jewish, as of course Jesus himself was, others would interpret that cry on the entry of Jesus in its proper meaning, as a cry by the people for salvation and rescue.

It is applied in numerous verses of the New Testament, including "Hosanna; blessed is the one who comes in the name of the Lord"; "hosanna in the highest"; and "hosanna to the Son of David".  These quotations, however, are of words in the Jewish Psalm 118.

The "Hosanna Anthem", based on the phrase Hosanna, is a traditional Moravian Church anthem written by Bishop Christian Gregor of Herrnhut sung on Palm Sunday and the first Sunday of Advent.  It is antiphonal, i.e. a call-and-response song; traditionally, it is sung between the children and adult congregation, though it is not unheard of for it to be done in other ways, such as between choir and congregation, or played between trombone choirs.

Many songs for church use bear the title "Hosanna", including songs written by New Zealand singer Brooke Fraser Ligertwood (released on the 2007 Hillsong United albums All of the Above and live on Saviour King and covered by the Canadian group Starfield on their album I Will Go); another song by Paul Baloche on his 2006 album A Greater Song; another by gospel artist Kirk Franklin, and another by Andrew Peterson on his 2008 album Resurrection Letters II.  Sidney Mohede's "Hosanna (Be Lifted High)" was included on Israel Houghton's 2011 Grammy Award-winning album Love God, Love People. "Hosanna! Loud Hosanna" is a well-known hymn by Jeanette Threlfall.

In the Philippines, particularly in Tagalog-speaking provinces, the term Osanahan refers to a procession of the faithful with the priest from a prayer station (termed kuból or Galilea in some places) after the blessing of palms to the local church for the Palm Sunday liturgy. At each stop, children dressed as angels sing the antiphon Hosanna Filio David in Filipino or Latin along with traditional music by a rondalla or a brass band.

Other examples of modern usage

The Latin phrase  features in the refrain of the 1924 Christmas carol Ding Dong Merrily on High.

Architect Frank Lloyd Wright famously used the word in his exclamation "Hosanna! A client!" after securing a commission, breaking a long, dry spell.

In the 1969 Broadway musical 1776 the word is used repeatedly as part of the chorus of the song "Cool, Cool, Considerate Men."

"Hosanna" is the name of one of the songs featured in the 1971 rock opera Jesus Christ Superstar.  The song covers the entry of Jesus into Jerusalem, as in the above Biblical passages.  Jesus is briefly harassed by the high priest Caiaphas but the people celebrate him as the Messiah. There is also a reprise of the chorus when Jesus is sent to King Herod.

A. R. Rahman composed the song "Hosanna" for the 2010 Tamil movie Vinnaithaandi Varuvaayaa. Here the word is used as an exclamation of joy when a man sees his beloved. The Christian Catholic Secular Forum (CSF) objected to this song and asked film-makers Fox Star Studios to remove it from the final cut of the Hindi remake of the film, Ekk Deewana Tha.

Paul McCartney's album New, released in 2013, features a song titled Hosanna. Contextually, he uses the phrase as a cry for help in light of the world's current state of affairs.

American comedians Tim and Eric use the phrase "blessed Hosanna" freely in their piece "Morning Prayer with Skott and Behr."

See also

 
 Hallelujah
 Hosanna shout – a Latter Day Saint practice

References

Sources
 Yohannan Aharoni & Michael Avi-Yonah, The MacMillan Bible Atlas'', Revised Edition, pp. 157–165 (1968 & 1977 by Carta Ltd).

External links

Christian worship and liturgy
Christian terminology
Jewish services
New Testament Aramaic words and phrases
New Testament Hebrew words and phrases
Sukkot
English words